MM or variants may refer to:

Alphabets 
 Meitei Mayek or Meetei Mayek, the writing system of Meitei language

Arts, entertainment, and media

Music
 MM (album), 1989, by Marisa Monte 
 Maelzel's metronome, a music marking
 Marilyn Manson, an American musician
 Master of Music, an academic degree
 Melody Maker British music publication
 "MM", a 1993 song by Mr. President

Television
 MM (TV channel), Bulgaria
 MM, the production code for the 1967 Doctor Who serial The Tomb of the Cybermen

Other media
 MM!, a Japanese light novel, manga and anime series by Akinari Matsuno
 Media Molecule, a video game developer in England
 Monster Manual, a 1977 Dungeons & Dragons source book
 Mother's Milk (character), aka "MM", a fictional character in The Boys comicbook franchise

Businesses, organizations, and teams

 Maryknoll, a Catholic religious institute
 Maybach-Motorenbau GmbH and Maybach-Manufaktur and Mercedes-Maybach; an engine and car marque
 Moderation Management, alcohol support group
 Mumbai Magicians, a defunct Hockey India League franchise
 Peach (airline) (IATA code: MM)
 SAM Colombia (former IATA code: MM)

Degrees, honorifics, and titles
 Machinist's Mate in the US Navy
 Master of Management, a degree
 Master mariner
 Master of Music, a degree
 Military Medal, British and Commonwealth
 Minister Mentor, a Singapore cabinet position
 messieurs, a plural honorific in French

Latinisms
 2000 (number) in Roman numerals
 The year 2000 in Roman numerals
 Mutatis mutandis ("m.m."), "with things changed that should be changed"

Places
 Metro Manila, the Philippines' national capital region
 Mega Manila, its larger metropolis
 Myanmar (ISO 3166-1 country code: MM)

Science, technology, and mathematics

Computing
 .mm, Internet country code top-level domain for Myanmar
 ".mm", the file extension for FreeMind and Freeplane data files
 ".mm", the file extension for source code files of Objective-C++
 mm tree, the Andrew Morton's Linux kernel tree
 MM algorithm, an iterative method for constructing optimization algorithms
 Columbia MM, an early e-mail client
 Multiple master fonts
 Mattermost, an online chat service

Units of measurement
 Megametre (Mm) (rare) 1,000km
Mile Marker (MM)
 Millimetre (mm)
 Millimolar (mM), a unit of concentration of a solution
 Momme, a unit of textile measurement
 One million (MM), used in reference to currency
 Percent concentration by mass (m/m%, %m/m, or m%), a unit of relative mass concentration

Other uses in science, technology, and mathematics
 Minimax or maximin, a decision rule
 Modified Mercalli scale for the intensity of earthquakes
 Moving magnet, phonograph cartridge type
 Moving mean in statistics
 Multiple myeloma

See also

 
 
 M (disambiguation)
 M2 (disambiguation)
 2M (disambiguation)
 MMS (disambiguation)
 M&M (disambiguation)